Academy of Information Technology may refer to:
 Academy of Information Technology (Australia), academy in Australia
 Academy of Information Technology (USA), academy in the United States, part of the National Academy Foundation